Semenovskoye Shidrovo is an airport in Russia located 8 km southeast of Bereznik. It consists of a paved airstrip.

References
RussianAirFields.com

Airports built in the Soviet Union
Airports in Arkhangelsk Oblast